Huimin may refer to:

People 
Hui people (回民)
Situ Huimin (1910–1987), Chinese film director, screenwriter and actor
Wang Huimin (born 1992), female Chinese volleyball player
Yang Huimin (1915–1992), Girl Guide during the 1937 Battle of Shanghai
Zhang Huimin (born 1999), Chinese girl who completed a 3,550 kilometres run when she was eight years old
Huimin Zhao, chemical engineering professor at the University of Illinois, Urbana-Champaign

Places
Huimin County, Shandong
Huimin District, Hohhot, Inner Mongolia
Huimin, Lancang County, Lancang Lahu Autonomous County, Yunan